Huni may refer to:

People 
 Huni, an ancient Egyptian king and the last pharaoh of the 3rd dynasty during the Old Kingdom period
 Huni (gamer), in-game name of Seung Heo-hoon, a South Korean professional League of Legends player

Places 
 Huni Sefid, a village in Shahi Rural District, Sardasht District, Dezful County, Khuzestan Province, Iran
 Huni Valley, a small town in the Prestea-Huni Valley District of Ghana's Western Region.
 Huni Valley Senior High School
 Honuj, a village in Ekhtiarabad Rural District, in the Central District of Kerman County, Kerman Province, Iran

Other 
 HuniePop, an adult hybrid tile matching puzzle game and dating sim

See also 
 Honey (disambiguation)